Neenchelys cheni is an eel in the family Ophichthidae (worm/snake eels). It was described by Johnson T. F. Chen and Herman Ting-Chen Weng in 1967, originally under the genus Myrophis. It is a marine, temperate water-dwelling eel which is known from Taiwan, in the northwestern Pacific Ocean.

The species epithet "cheni" refers to Tung-Pai Chen.

References

Fish described in 1967
cheni